The Medieval Review, formerly the Bryn Mawr Medieval Review, is a peer-reviewed online academic journal that was established in 1993. Originally the journal was published at the University of Washington, from 1995 to 2007 by Western Michigan University; since 2007 it is published by Indiana University. The journal reviews books on Medieval issues. The editor-in-chief is Deborah Mauskopf Deliyannis (Indiana University). The journal operates as a moderated email distribution list and is one of the oldest electronic journals in existence.

References

External links
 
 Archive 1993-present at Indiana University Bloomington

English-language journals
History journals
Publications established in 1993
Indiana University
Medieval studies literature
Open access journals
Online-only journals
Academic journals published by universities and colleges of the United States